Langworth railway station was a railway station in Langworth, Lincolnshire, opened in 1848 and closed in 1965. On 30 June 2015, a freight train was derailed near the site of the station.  On 3 March 2017 The station building was damaged when a stolen car drove through the railway barriers, injuring the two teenage boys in the car.

References

Disused railway stations in Lincolnshire
Railway stations in Great Britain opened in 1848
Railway stations in Great Britain closed in 1965
Former Great Central Railway stations